Limuloides is a genus of synziphosurine, a paraphyletic group of fossil chelicerate arthropods. Limuloides was regarded as part of the clade Planaterga. Fossils of the genus have been discovered in deposits of the Silurian period in the United Kingdom and potentially in the United States. Limuloides is one of the two genera of the family Bunodidae, the other being the type genus Bunodes. Limuloides is characterized by a carapace with radiated ridges and serrated lateral regions, and an opisthosoma with rows of nodes. Limuloides was once though to have lateral compound eyes on its carapace, but later investigation did not find any evidence of it.

References

Synziphosurina
Planaterga
Silurian first appearances
Silurian arthropods
Fossils of England
Fossils of the United States
Fossil taxa described in 1865